Platinum(II) bis(acetylacetonate) is the coordination compound with the formula Pt(O2C5H7)2, abbreviated Pt(acac)2.  The homoleptic acetylacetonate complex of platinum(II), it is a yellow, benzene-soluble solid.  According to X-ray crystallography, the Pt center is square planar. The compound is a widely used precursor to platinum-based catalysts.  

The complex is prepared by the reaction of the platinum(II) aquo complex [Pt(H2O)4]2+ with acetylacetone.

See also
 Palladium(II) bis(acetylacetonate)
 Nickel(II) bis(acetylacetonate)

References

Acetylacetonate complexes
Platinum complexes